Lenins Weg ('Path of Lenin') was a German-language newspaper published in Soviet Azerbaijan. It was published from Helenendorf between 1932 and 1936, and in 1936 from Baku. Lenins Weg functioned as a republic-level newspaper for the German population in Soviet Azerbaijan.

See also
Bauer und Arbeiter

References

Defunct newspapers published in Azerbaijan
German-language communist newspapers
Mass media in Baku
Newspapers published in the Soviet Union
Publications established in 1932
Publications disestablished in 1936